Santo Domingo is the male volleyball team of Espaillat.

History
The team was founded in 2007.

Current squad
As of December 2008

Coach:  Guillermo Gómez

Assistant coach:  Elvis Cepeda

Release or Transfer

References

External links
League official website

2007 establishments in the Dominican Republic
Dominican Republic volleyball clubs
Volleyball clubs established in 2007